Blackfish is a common name for the following species of fish, dolphins, and whales:

Fish
 Alaska blackfish, (Dallia pectoralis), an Esocidae from Alaska, Siberia and the Bering Sea islands
 Black fish (Carassioides acuminatus) a cyprinid from China and Vietnam
 Black ruff (Centrolophus niger)
 Black sea bass (Centropristis striata)
 Cornish blackfish (Schedophilus medusophagus)
 Gadopsis, two Australian freshwater fish
 River blackfish (G. marmoratus)
 Two-spined blackfish (G. bispinosus)
 Galjoen (Dichistius capensis)
 Imperial blackfish (Schedophilus ovalis)
 Japanese black porgy, Acanthopagrus schlegelii, a large sea bream often cultivated in aquaculture
 Parore (Girella tricuspidata)
 Sacramento blackfish (Orthodon microlepidotus)
 Tautog (Tautoga onitis)

Dolphins
Pilot whales, genus Globicephala

Whales 

 Many-toothed blackfish (Peponocephala electra)

Former disambiguation pages converted to set index articles